Ida Alcorn Revels Redmond (19 May or July 1873 – 21 or 23 May 1914) was a teacher and women's organizer in the United States. She encouraged self-improvement efforts through civic, education and social services. Her father was Hiram Revels, the first African American to represent Mississippi in the U.S. Congress, from 1870 to 1871.

Ida Revels married Sidney Dillon Redmond (1871–1948), a local physician turned lawyer and businessman. Their son Sidney Revels Redmond became an NAACP lawyer. They also had a daughter Esther.

Ida and her husband studied at Rust University.

Ida Revels Redmond died in May 1914, aged 41. Her grave, including a statue of her, is at the Mount Olive Cemetery in Jackson, Hinds County, Mississippi. The statue was restored by Jackson State University in 2018.

References

External links
Findagrave entry (1)
Findagrave entry (2)

1873 births
1914 deaths
People from Klinsky District
African-American educators
Place of death missing
American educators
American women educators
20th-century African-American people
20th-century African-American women